Gloucester 1 is an English rugby union league which sits at the ninth level of league rugby union in England for teams based primarily in the county of Gloucestershire but also on occasion teams from Bristol. Promoted clubs move into Gloucester Premier and relegated clubs drop into either Gloucester 2 North or Gloucester 2 South depending on location.  Each year clubs in this division also take part in the RFU Junior Vase - a level 9-12 national competition.

Teams 2021–22

For the new season Gloucester 1 was split into North and South Divisions with the addition of several second teams from sides higher in the pyramid with twelve clubs in each division

North

South

2020–21
Due to the COVID-19 pandemic, the 2020–21 season was cancelled.

Teams 2019–20

Teams 2018–19

Teams 2017–18

Teams 2016-17
Ashley Downs Old Boys (promoted from Gloucester 2)
Bream (relegated from Gloucester Premier)
Bredon Star
Brockworth
Dursley
Gloucester Old Boys
Old Cryptians
Southmead
Spartans (promoted from Gloucester 2)
St Brendan's Old Boys
Tewkesbury (relegated from Gloucester Premier)
Widden Old Boys

Teams 2015–16
The 2015–16 Gloucester 1 consists of twelve teams from Gloucestershire and Bristol as well as one team just over the border in Worcestershire. The season starts on 12 September 2015 and is due to end on 23 April 2016.  Eight of the twelve teams participated in last season's competition. The 2014–15 champions Longlevens and runners up Chipping Sodbury were promoted to the Gloucester Premier while Old Colstonians and Kingswood were relegated to Gloucester 2.

Teams 2014-15
Bredon Star (promoted from Gloucester 2)
Brockworth
Chipping Sodbury
Dursley (relegated from Gloucester Premier)
Gloucester Old Boys
Kingswood
Longlevens
Old Colstonians
Old Cryptians (promoted from Gloucester 2)
Old Richians
Southmead (relegated from Gloucester Premier)
Widden Old Boys

Teams 2013–14
Ashley Down Old Boys (promoted from Gloucester 2)
Bishopston
Bream (promoted from Gloucester 2)
Brockworth

Chipping Sodbury
Gloucester Old Boys
Kingswood
Longlevens
Old Colstonians
Old Richians
Widden Old Boys (relegated from Gloucester Premier)

Teams 2012–13
Bishopston
Broad Plain
Brockworth
Cheltenham Saracens
Chipping Sodbury
Gloucester Old Boys
Hucclecote
Kingswood
Longlevens
Newent
Old Colstonians
Old Richians

Teams 2011-12
Ashley Down Old Boys
Bream
Brockworth
Cheltenham Saracens (promoted from Gloucester 2)
Dursley
Gloucester Old Boys
Hucclecote
Kingswood
Newent (promoted from Gloucester 2)
Ross-on-Wye
Spartans

Teams 2010-11
Aretians
Ashley Down Old Boys
Bishopston
Bream
Cheltenham Civil Service
Cotham Park
Dursley
Hucclecote
Kingswood
Longlevens
Painswick
Spartans

Teams 2009-10
Aretians
Ashley Down Old Boys
Bishopston
Bream
Brockworth
Cheltenham Civil Service
Chipping Sodbury
Dursley
Longlevens
Old Bristolians
Old Cryptians
Painswick

Teams 2008-09
Aretians
Ashley Down Old Boys
Bishopston
Brockworth
Cheltenham Civil Service
Chipping Sodbury
Dursley
Longlevens
Old Bristolians
Painswick
Ross-on-Wye
Tewkesbury

Teams 2007-08
Bishopston
Bream
Bristol Saracens
Brockworth
Chipping Sodbury
Dursley
Longlevens
Old Bristolians
Painswick
Ross-on-Wye
Southmead
Tewkesbury

Teams 2006-07
Bishopston
Bream
Bristol Saracens
Brockworth
Cheltenham Civil Service
Chipping Sodbury
Hartpury College
Hucclecote
Old Bristolians
Old Cryptians
Southmead
Tewkesbury

Teams 2005-06
Bristol Saracens
Bishopston
Bream
Cheltenham Civil Service
Chipping Sodbury
Cirencester
Frampton Cotterell
Old Bristolians
Southmead
Tewkesbury

Teams 2004-05
Ashley Down Old Boys
Bristol Saracens
Bishopston
Cirencester
Chipping Sodbury
Frampton Cotterell
Old Bristolians
Old Colstonians
Old Cryptians
Widden Old Boys

Teams 2003-04
Ashley Down Old Boys
Bishopston
Bristol Saracens
Brockworth
Cheltenham Saracens
Frampton Cotterell
Hucclecote
Southmead
Tewkesbury
Widden Old Boys

Teams 2002-03
Ashley Down Old Boys
Bishopston
Bream
Bristol Saracens
Brockworth
Chipping Sodbury
Frampton Cotterell
Old Bristolians
Southmead
Tewkesbury

Teams 2001-02
Aretians
Ashley Down Old Boys
Bream
Brockworth
Frampton Cotterell
Painswick
Old Bristolians
Old Cryptians
Tewkesbury
Westbury-on-Severn

Teams 2000-01
Ashley Down Old Boys
Cheltenham Civil Service
Cheltenham Saracens
Chosen Hill Former Pupils
Frampton Cotterell
Hucclecote
Old Bristolians
Old Cryptians
Tetbury
Westbury-on-Severn

Original teams
When league rugby began in 1987 this division (known as Gloucestershire 1) contained the following teams:

Bream
Bristol Saracens
Cheltenham North
Dings Crusaders
Drybrook
Longlevens
Old Colstonians
Old Patesians
Spartans
St. Mary's Old Boys
Widden Old Boys

Gloucester 1 honours

Gloucestershire 1 (1987–1991)

Originally known as Gloucestershire 1, it was a tier 9 league with promotion to Gloucestershire/Somerset and relegation to Gloucester 2.

Gloucester 1 (1991–1993)

Gloucestershire 1 was shorted to Gloucester 1 for the 1991–92 season onward.  It remained a tier 9 league with promotion to Gloucestershire/Somerset and relegation to Gloucester 2.

Gloucester 1 (1993–1996)

The creation of National League 5 South for the 1993–94 season meant that Gloucester 1 dropped to become a tier 10 league.  Promotion continued to Gloucestershire/Somerset and relegation to Gloucester 2.

Gloucester 1 (1996–2000)

The cancellation of National League 5 South at the end of the 1995–96 season meant that Gloucester 1 reverted to being a tier 9 league.  Promotion continued to Gloucestershire/Somerset and relegation to Gloucester 2.

Gloucester 1 (2000–2009)

Gloucester 1 remained a tier 9 league despite the cancellation of Gloucestershire/Somerset at the end of the 1999–00 season.  Promotion was now to the new Gloucester Premier, while relegation continued to Gloucester 2.  Between 2007 and 2009 Gloucester 1 was sponsored by High Bridge Jewellers.

Gloucester 1 (2009–2017)

Despite widespread restructuring by the RFU at the end of the 2008–09 season, Gloucester 1 remained a tier 9 league, with promotion continuing to Gloucester Premier and relegation to Gloucester 2.

Gloucester 1 (2017–present)

Gloucester 1 remained a tier 9 league with promotion continuing to Gloucester Premier, while relegation was now to either Gloucester 2 North or Gloucester 2 South (formerly a single division).  The league was now sponsored by Wadworth 6x.

Number of league titles

Aretians (2)
Bristol Saracens (2)
Old Bristolians (2)
Spartans (2)
Tewkesbury (2)
Berry Hill (1)
Bishopston (1)
Bream (1)
Cheltenham North (1)
Chipping Sodbury (1)
Chosen Hill Former Pupils (1)
Cirencester (1)
Cleve (1)
Dings Crusaders (1)
Drybrook (1)
Gloucester Old Boys (1)
Hartpury College (1)
Longlevens (1)
Newent (1)
Old Centralians (1)
Old Cryptians (1)
Old Richians (1)
Painswick (1)
Ross-on-Wye (1)
St. Mary's Old Boys (1)
Stow-on-the-Wold (1)
Widden Old Boys (1)

See also
 South West Division RFU
 Gloucestershire RFU
 English rugby union system
 Rugby union in England

Notes

References

9
Rugby union in Gloucestershire
Rugby union in Bristol